Tobias Klas Anders Englund (born 6 February 1989) is a Swedish footballer who plays for Arendal.

Englund started at IFK Värnamo and played for the A team between 2005 and 2016. In January 2017, Englund was recruited by Falkenbergs FF  on a two-year contract. In November 2018, Englund extended his contract by two years. On 31 March 2019 Englund made his Allsvenskan debut for Falkenbergs against Örebro SK. In March 2022, he signed a contract with Norwegian club Arendal.

References

1989 births
Living people
Swedish footballers
Swedish expatriate footballers
Association football defenders
IFK Värnamo players
Falkenbergs FF players
Arendal Fotball players
Ettan Fotboll players
Superettan players
Allsvenskan players
Expatriate footballers in Norway
Swedish expatriate sportspeople in Norway